The 2007–08 Liga Bet season saw Ahva Arraba (champions of the North A division), Maccabi Kafr Qara (champions of the North B division), Hapoel Hadera (champions of the South A division) and Hapoel Masos/Segev Shalom (champions of the South B division) winning the title and promotion to Liga Alef.

The runners-up in each division entered a promotion/relegation play-offs with the clubs ranked 12th in Liga Alef, Maccabi Tamra (from North A division) and Hapoel Arad (from South B division) won their respective play-offs and were promoted.

At the bottom, Maccabi Kafr Yasif, Hapoel Yanuh (from North A division), Hapoel Yokneam, Maccabi Or Akiva (from North B division), Beitar Pardes Hanna, Hapoel Qalansawe (from South A division), Hapoel Tel Sheva and Hapoel Oranit (from South B division) were all automatically relegated to Liga Gimel

Changes from last season

Team changes

To/from Liga Alef
 Beitar Ihud Mashhad was promoted from North A division to Liga Alef; Maccabi Sektzia Ma'alot-Tarshiha and Hapoel Kafr Sumei were relegated from Liga Alef and were placed in North A division.
 Ironi Sayid Umm al-Fahm and Ironi Tiberias were promoted from North B division to Liga Alef; Since Hapoel Reineh folded, no relegated club was placed in North B division.
 Maccabi Ironi Kfar Yona and Beitar Kfar Saba were promoted from South A division to Liga Alef; A.S. Ramat Eliyahu was relegated from Liga Alef and was placed in South A division.
 Maccabi Ironi Netivot was promoted from South B division to Liga Alef; Hapoel Arad was relegated from Liga Alef and was placed in South B division.

Intra-divisional movements
 Beitar Kafr Kanna was transferred from North A division to North B division.

To/from Liga Gimel
 Ahi Acre and F.C. Ahva Kafr Manda (both from Liga Gimel Upper Galilee) were promoted to North A division, to replace the relegated Hapoel Kisra and Hapoel Deir Hanna.
 Maccabi Beit She'an (from Liga Gimel Jezreel) and Maccabi Barta'a (from Liga Gimel Shomron) were promoted to North B division to replace the demoted Hapoel Tel Hanan and Maccabi Daliyat al-Karmel.
 F.C. Ironi Or Yehuda (from Liga Gimel Tel Aviv) and Hapoel Pardesiya (from Liga Gimel Sharon) were promoted to South A division to replace the relegated Hapoel Kiryat Ono and Hapoel Ihud Bnei Jaffa.
 Bnei Eilat and F.C. Be'er Sheva (both from Liga Gimel Center-South) were promoted to South B division to replace the relegated Maccabi Kiryat Ekron and Hapoel Bnei Lakhish.
 Since Hapoel Reineh folded over the summer, Hapoel Kvalim Mesilot were promoted from Liga Gimel Jezreel) to North B division fill the vacant space.
 Since Hapoel Maxim Lod folded over the summer, Ortodoxim Jaffa were promoted to South A division fill the vacant space.

North A Division

North B Division

South A Division

South B Division

Promotion play-offs

North play-off
Liga Bet North A and Liga Bet North B runners-up, Maccabi Tamra faced the 12th placed club in Liga Alef North, Beitar Haifa in a two legged play-off. The Liga Bet North A runners-up, Hapoel Iksal was suspended from the play-offs, following an attempt for match fixing, prior to their scheduled match against Beitar Haifa.

Maccabi Tamra won 4-2 on aggregate and was promoted to Liga Alef.

South play-off
Liga Bet South A and Liga Bet South B runners-up, Hapoel Mahane Yehuda and Hapoel Arad faced the 12th placed club in Liga Alef South, Hapoel Tzafririm Holon. The teams played each other in a round-robin tournament.

Hapoel Arad won the play-offs and was promoted to Liga Alef.

References
 The Israel Football Association 
 The Israel Football Association 
 The Israel Football Association 
 The Israel Football Association 
Play-offs: Hapoel Arad promoted to Liga Alef The Israel Football Association, 23.5.2008 
Play-offs: Maccabi Tamra promoted to Liga Alef North The Israel Football Association, 3.6.2008 

Liga Bet seasons
5
Israel